The Laurel View River is a  tidal river in the U.S. state of Georgia.  It is fed by the Jerico River, which splits into the Laurel View and Belfast rivers, and ends where the Belfast River rejoins it, forming the Medway River, which continues to the Atlantic Ocean.  For its entire length, the Laurel View River forms the boundary between Bryan and Liberty counties.

See also
List of rivers of Georgia

References 

USGS Hydrologic Unit Map - State of Georgia (1974)

Rivers of Georgia (U.S. state)
Rivers of Bryan County, Georgia
Rivers of Liberty County, Georgia